The Battle of Fundina took place on 2 August 1876 in Fundina, a village in Kuči, Principality of Montenegro. The day had a religious importance, as being the St. Elijah's Day (Eastern Orthodox calendar). The Montenegrin Army was led by the two Montenegrin dukes, Ilija Plamenac and Marko Miljanov, who had about 5,000 troop under their direct command. Ottomans had strength of 40,000. Days before the battle, a 
Montenegrin Muslim, Mašo-Hadži Ahmetov revealed Ottoman plans to Marko Miljanov, so that Montenegrins knew where the attack was going to come from.

The Ottomans advanced from the Southwest towards Kuči, planning their final attack for 3 August. But, since Montenegrin commanders knew of their plans, they counterattacked a day before. Most of the fighting occurred at the bottom of Heljam hill, where Ottomans were defending from the trenches. While Marko Miljanov was in the front lines, Ilija Plamenac was commanding the Montenegrin army from the back, developing a strategy. After the victory was secured, Montenegrins captured the Ottoman leaders, put them in a house and burned it to the ground. The rest of Montenegrins chased the remaining Ottomans southward, forcing them into a fast retreat.  The exact number of Montenegrin casualties is unknown, but it is certain that Ceklin battalion suffered the greatest losses. The most successful part of the Montenegrin Army was Martinići battalion, which killed 2,000 Ottomans, and captured 6 enemy flags. Novak Vujošević from Kuči tribe was the biggest hero of the battle, killing 28 enemy soldiers; he later received an award from the Russian emperor. After the battle, Montenegrins sent a "gift" to Mahmud Pasha - a live wolf, as a symbol of Montenegrin pride and freedom. Marko Miljanov, one of the two Montenegrin commanders, was awarded the best captured sword and a house in Medun, which is today a museum. After the battle, Kuči clan was awarded a medal for bravery by King Nicholas I. The importance of this Montenegrin victory was that it stopped the Ottoman advance, and secured Montenegrin victory in the Montenegrin–Turkish War of 1876–1878.

Notes

Sources 
William H. Guttenberg; History becomes alive

See also
Montenegrin-Turkish War of 1876-1878
Battle of Vučji Do
Principality of Montenegro
Marko Miljanov Popović

Ottoman period in the history of Montenegro
Battles involving Montenegro
Battles involving the Ottoman Empire
Conflicts in 1876
1876 in the Ottoman Empire
1876 in Europe
Montenegrin–Ottoman War (1876–1878)